Kalin Lindena (born 1977 Hanover) is a German artist.

She graduated from the Hochschule für Bildende Künste Braunschweig in 2004, where she studied with Walter Dahn.

She showed at Simultanhalle, Cologne, DéPENDANCE, Brussels, and Stirling, UK.
She lives in Berlin.

Awards
2009 Villa Romana prize

Solo shows
2009  Names Bridges – CUBITT, London (England); Die paar Unentwegten – Teil II – Galerie Christian Nagel – Köln, Cologne; 7x14 – Kalin Lindena – Staatliche Kunsthalle Baden-Baden, Baden-Baden
2008  Für alles gegen gut ist – Galerie Parisa Kind, Frankfurt/Main;  Kunstverein Heilbronn, Heilbronn
2006  Hände wie Spiegel / Hands Like Mirrors – Galerie Bleich-Rossi, Vienna;  Um Ein Tanz – Galerie Christian Nagel – Berlin, Berlin
2005  Lächelte Ernst – Galerie Bleich-Rossi, Vienna;  Beim Namen – Meyer Riegger Karlsruhe, Karlsruhe
2004  "Find Dich Licht" – Galerie Christian Nagel – Köln, Cologne
2002  "Wir Nennen Einen Berg Nach Dir" – Galerie Christian Nagel – Berlin, Berlin;  expecting rain – Meyer Riegger Karlsruhe, Karlsruhe
2001  Kunstverein Braunschweig e.V., Braunschweig

References

German artists
1977 births
Artists from Hanover
Living people